Vladimir Abdualievich Vasilyev (born August 11, 1949), is a Russian politician who currently serves as parliamentary leader of United Russia in the State Duma. He served as Head of the Republic of Dagestan from 2017 to 2020.

Biography 
Vasilyev is of half-Russian, half-Kazakh descent. He was a deputy of the State Duma of the IV, V, VI and VII convocation, and a deputy speaker of the State Duma of the VI and VII convocation, the head of the United Russia faction, chairman of the Duma committee on security (2004-2011), and Deputy Secretary of the Security Council (1999-2001). Colonel-General of police, the candidate of legal sciences.
He was awarded the Order For Merit to the Fatherland  3rd and 4th classes, Order of Courage, Order of Honour.

Vasilyev became the acting Head of the Republic of Dagestan after the resignation of Ramazan Abdulatipov on 3 October 2017. On 9 September 2018, Vasilyev was confirmed to be the official Head of the Republic of Dagestan. On 5 October 2020, Vasilyev resigned his post as Head of the Republic of Dagestan due to health reasons.

On 19 September 2021, Vasilyev was again elected to the State Duma. On 7 October 2021, he was again elected parliamentary leader of United Russia.

References

External links
 Official website

1949 births
Living people
People from Klinsky District
United Russia politicians
Recipients of the Order "For Merit to the Fatherland", 3rd class
Recipients of the Order of Courage
Recipients of the Order of Honour (Russia)
21st-century Russian politicians
Fourth convocation members of the State Duma (Russian Federation)
Fifth convocation members of the State Duma (Russian Federation)
Sixth convocation members of the State Duma (Russian Federation)
Seventh convocation members of the State Duma (Russian Federation)
Eighth convocation members of the State Duma (Russian Federation)
Kutafin Moscow State Law University alumni